PL-6983 is a synthetic peptide and selective MC4 receptor agonist which is under development by Palatin Technologies for the treatment of female sexual dysfunction and erectile dysfunction. It was developed as a successor to/replacement of bremelanotide (PT-141) due to concerns of the side effect of increased blood pressure seen with the latter in clinical trials. Relative to bremelanotide, PL-6983 produces significantly lower increases in blood pressure in animal models. The drug has reportedly been in pre-clinical development for all medical indications since 2008. Palatin has stated that "We are focusing development efforts on bremelanotide for [female sexual dysfunction], but are continuing evaluation of PL-6983." The chemical structure of PL-6983 has yet to be made public.

See also
 List of investigational sexual dysfunction drugs
 Melanocortin 4 receptor § Agonists

References

External links
PL-6983 for Sexual Dysfunction - Palatin Technologies
PL-6983 for Female Sexual Dysfunction - Palatin Technologies
Palatin Obtains $21.1M to Advance Programs in Female Sexual Dysfunction and Asthma - Genetic Engineering and Biotechnology News
Research Programme: Sexual Dysfunction Therapy (PL-6983) - Palatin Technologies - AdisInsight
How Sildenax Works? Composition & Benefits of Sildenax - Nutri Medi
How Medicines Work To Improve Potency - Vera Farmacia

Aphrodisiacs
Drugs with undisclosed chemical structures
Erectile dysfunction drugs
Female sexual dysfunction drugs
Melanocortin receptor agonists
Peptides